The following lists events that happened during 1977 in Laos.

Incumbents
President: Souphanouvong 
Prime Minister: Kaysone Phomvihane

Events
18 July - Laos signs a friendship treaty with Vietnam, providing for Vietnamese aid loans and reconstruction projects.

Births
20 July - Anoulack Chanthivong, Australian politician

References

 
Years of the 20th century in Laos
Laos
1970s in Laos
Laos